Castillo de Moguer is a castle in Moguer, in the province of Huelva, Spain. It was renovated and enlarged in the 14th century.

Castillo de Moguer was built of mud-based mortar gravel, clay and lime. It is of an imperfect square plan  in size, with four towers at the corners. A moat surrounded the castle, as evidenced by written records, but is not currently visible. 

Access to the castle was across the northwest side, now Santo Domingo Street, via a ramp. Each tower measures  and contains two chambers with a covered brick dome. The four towers were topped by battlements. A cellar dating to the 18th century, measures  and serves as the headquarters of the Tourist Office.

References

GONZÁLEZ GÓMEZ, Antonio: Moguer en la Baja Edad Media. Diputación Provincial de Huelva, Huelva, 1976.
ROPERO REGIDOR, Diego. El castillo fortaleza de Moguer. Col. "Montemayor", Archivo Histórico Municipal; Fundación Municipal Cultura, Moguer, 1990
Moguer 500 Años. Catálogo de la Exposición. (Iglesia de San Francisco de Moguer, 3 de agosto - 2 de septiembre de 1992). Ayuntamiento de Moguer, 1992.
ROPERO REGIDOR, Diego. Los lugares colombinos y su entorno. Fundación Ramón Areces, Madrid, 1992.

External links

Bien de Interés Cultural landmarks in the Province of Huelva
Castles in Andalusia